American University of Nigeria The American University of Nigeria (AUN) is a private university in Yola the capital of Adamawa, Nigeria. It offers an American-style liberal arts higher education at undergraduate, graduate, and professional levels. Founded in 2003,[1] AUN, Africa’s first “Development University,” is accredited by the National Universities Commission (NUC).[2]  Its current faculty numbers 93, its undergraduate and graduate enrollment is 1500 students. as the first American-style university in Sub-Saharan Africa. AUN is accredited by the National Universities Commission (NUC).

History
Founded in 2004 by a former Vice President of Nigeria and Peoples Democratic Party presidential candidate in the 2019 election, Atiku Abubakar, American University of Nigeria enrolled its first students in 2005. The university is located in Yola, the state capital of Adamawa.

The university was originally named the ABTI American University of Nigeria before it was renamed to AUN. AUN is the first American-style institution of higher learning in sub-Saharan Africa (the only other such university in Africa is the American University in Cairo in Egypt). AUN is a member of the Global Liberal Arts Alliance.

The university's current president is Dr. Margee Ensign, preceded by Dr. David Huwiler, Dr. Michael Smith, Dr.  Margee Ensign, Dr. Dawn Dekle.

The institution was conceived as a university that would focus on development issues while providing an education modeled after the best US practices in content and pedagogy. The three original constituent schools were Arts & Sciences, Business & Entrepreneurship, and IT & Computing. In 2007, the name of the institution was changed to its present name of the American University of Nigeria (AUN). The pioneer class of 92 students graduated in 2009. Every class since then has graduated on schedule. 

In 2008, the National Universities Commission (NUC) accredited AUN programs and re-accredited them in 2013. In 2012, AUN launched a graduate program, the Executive Master’s degree in Information Technology. Since then, more programs up to the Ph.D. level have been approved by the NUC. 

In 2014, it opened the Robert A. Pastor Library and e-Learning Center.

Location 
AUN is located in Yola, the capital city of Adamawa State. The AUN campus occupies a serene savannah vegetation most of which was used as farmland.

Campus 
The main campus comprises 17 buildings including nine Residence Halls, a spacious cafeteria, a 3,500-capacity Commencement Hall which also serves as indoor basketball and volleyball court, a dedicated Students Hub, an environmentally-themed administrative building, School of Arts & Sciences building, and Peter Okocha building which houses the School of Law and its library. A new, more spacious building for the School of Law with a 100-seater auditorium opens in 2022. The Robert A. Pastor Library and E-Learning Center, which won the American Library Associations’ 2013 Presidential Citation for Innovative International Library Projects, contains a library section with over 250,000 digital holdings, classrooms, study rooms, reading zones, the Writing Center, classrooms for the New Foundation program, Advising Unit and the Honor Society tutoring center. The North Campus, which used to be the temporary site, is located across the street from the main campus.

Student Life 
Freshmen begin community service from the first semester during Freshmen Orientation. Throughout their four years, students are encouraged to volunteer actively in any of the regular, extracurricular outings that the Office organizes almost every day of the week.  Students work with people and organizations in the community, including schools, health clinics, community associations, and the local government.

Academics 
The university consists of six schools, offering the following undergraduate majors and graduate programs:

School of Arts and Sciences
 BSc Communications & Multimedia Design
 BSc Natural & Environmental Sciences
 BSc Petroleum Chemistry
 BA Economics
 BA Politics & International Studies 
 BA English Language & Literature

School of Business & Entrepreneurship
 BSc Business Administration (with specialties)
BSc Accounting
BSc Finance
BSc Marketing
BSc Entrepreneurship Management

School of Law 
 LL.B (Bachelor of Laws)

School of Engineering 
 BEng Chemical Engineering
 BEng Computer Engineering
 BEng Electrical/Electronics Engineering 
 BEng Telecommunication Engineering

School of Information Technology & Computing (SITC)
 BSc Software Engineering
 BSc Data Science & Analytics
 BSc Computer Science
 BSc Information Systems
 BSc Telecommunications & Wireless Technologies

School of Graduate Studies 
 Post Graduate Diploma in Management (PGDM)
 Master of Business Administration (MBA)
 MSc Business Administration
 PhD Business Administration
 Masters of Information Technology
 Masters of Telecommunications
 Masters of Information Systems Security Management
 MSc Computer Science
 MSc Information Systems
 PhD Computer Science
 PhD Information Systems

Hybrid/On-Campus Professional Masters Programs
 Master of Information & Communication Science (MICS)
 Master of Telecommunication & Wireless Technologies (MTWT)

Facilities 

AUN is a residential campus situated on 2,400 hectares. It is home to approximately 1,500 undergraduate students and 93 faculty members.

The university's e-Library Project received the American Library Association's Presidential Citation for Innovative International Library Projects in 2013.

Notable alumni 
 Verse Shon
 Dooyum Malu
 Nacha Geoffrey
 Zunzika Thole
 Cynthia Dieyi
 Rosemary Adaji
 Arinze Nwoye
 Maryam Abubakar
 Ifeatu Uzodinma
 Irene Nwoye
 Fisayo Stevens
 Muhammad Dikko
 Emmanuel Wogu
 Hafsat Adamu
 Onyebuchi Nwatu
 Tijjani Umar
 Maryam Lawan 
 Murna Lawan 
 Murna Mamman 
 Idris Mamman
 Naima Samuel
 Kenechukwu Nwagbo
 Gwaha Anthony Madwatte
 Daniel Harbour
 Innocent Demshemino
 Kingsley Jima
 Fatima Umar Ganduje
 Gregory Tanyi
 Adaobi Umaru
 Theoneste Manishimwe
 DJ Bally
 Emily Nkanga

Governance 
The AUN Board of Trustees consists of one American, Tulane Professor of Public Health, Dr. William Ellis Bertrand, and 12 eminent Nigerians, with Senator Ben Obi as Chairman of the Governing Council. AUN’s BoT members come from diverse backgrounds in academia, private and public sectors. The President/Vice-Chancellor of AUN is the Chief Executive Officer. The President’s Executive Council (PEC) is the top management organ and has as its members the Provost/VP for Academic Affairs, deans of the six Schools, the Vice Presidents for Administration/Registrar, Finance, and Student Affairs/Residence Life; and heads of Security, Enrolment Management, Technology Support, Physical Planning, Marketing & Communications, and University Events. The Senate is responsible for academic discipline and curriculum oversight while the Congregation, which comprises all staff with a minimum of a first degree, meets at least once every semester to receive a report of the University’s progress from the President.

List of presidents 
 David Huwiler
 Michael Smith
 Margee Ensign
 Dawn Dekle
 Margee Ensign

Notes

References
"The American University of Nigeria to Host 4th Annual Homecoming - Premium Times Nigeria". Retrieved 2015-08-07. 
"National Universities Commission". www.nuc.edu.ng. Archived from the original on 2015-08-15. Retrieved 2015-08-07. 
"Home". www.aaicu.org. Archived from the original on 2015-10-07. Retrieved 2015-10-07. 
"Schools - American University of Nigeria". www.aun.edu.ng. Archived from the original on 2015-08-14. Retrieved 2015-08-07. 
"Facilities - American University of Nigeria". www.aun.edu.ng. Archived from the original on 2015-08-14. Retrieved 2015-08-07. 
"ALA Presidential Citation for Innovative International Library Projects | International Relations Round Table (IRRT)". www.ala.org. Retrieved 2015-08-07. 
Shaw, Claire (2013-08-07). "Library futures: American University of Nigeria, Nigeria". the Guardian. Retrieved 2020-12-01. 
Brotherton, Phaedra (2 December 2004). "American University Assists Nigeria In Establishing U.S.-Style University". *Diverse: Issues In Higher Education. Retrieved 5 March 2018. ...AU has designated Dr. David Huwiler, the former president of the American University of Central Asia (AUCA) as the first president of AAUN. 
Anderson, Dan (25 February 2010). "Former Elon faculty member named president of The American University of Afghanistan". Elon University. Retrieved 5 March 2018. 

Universities and colleges in Nigeria
Education in Adamawa State
Educational institutions established in 2004
2004 establishments in Nigeria
Private universities and colleges in Nigeria